Bicentennial Man is a 1999 American science fiction comedy-drama film starring Robin Williams, Sam Neill, Embeth Davidtz (in a dual role), Wendy Crewson, and Oliver Platt. Based on the 1992 novel The Positronic Man by Isaac Asimov and Robert Silverberg (which is itself based on Asimov's original 1976 novelette "The Bicentennial Man"), the plot explores issues of humanity, slavery, prejudice, maturity, intellectual freedom, conformity, sex, love, mortality, and eternal life. The film, a co-production between Touchstone Pictures and Columbia Pictures, was directed by Chris Columbus. The title comes from the main character existing to the age of two hundred years.

Bicentennial Man was released by Buena Vista Pictures in the United States on December 17, 1999 and received mixed reviews from critics. The film was also a box office bomb, grossing only $87.4 million against a $90–100 million budget.

Makeup artist Greg Cannom was nominated for the Academy Award for Best Makeup at the 72nd Academy Awards. The theme song of the film, "Then You Look at Me", was written by James Horner and Will Jennings and sung by Celine Dion.

Plot 

On April 3, 2005, the NDR series robot "Andrew" is introduced into the Martin family home to perform housekeeping and maintenance duties and introduces himself by showing a presentation of the Three Laws of Robotics. The eldest daughter Grace despises Andrew, but her younger sister Amanda is sympathetic to him, and Andrew discovers he feels emotions, and is drawn to spend more time with his "Little Miss". He accidentally breaks one of her glass figurines and is able to carve a new one out of wood, which surprises her father Richard. He takes Andrew to NorthAm Robotics to inquire if Andrew's creativity was part of his programming. NorthAm's CEO Dennis Mansky claims this is a problem and offers to scrap Andrew, but instead Richard takes Andrew back home and encourages him to continue his creativity and explore other humanities. Andrew becomes a clockmaker and earns a sizable fortune managed by Richard after they find that robots have no rights under current laws.

Time passes, and Richard encourages Dennis to give Andrew the ability to present facial expressions to match his emotions. About two decades after being awoken, Andrew presents Richard with all the money he has made to ask for his freedom. Wounded by this, Richard refuses to accept it but does grant Andrew his independence, on the condition he may no longer reside at the Martin home. Andrew builds his own home by the beach. In 2048, Richard is on his death bed, and apologizes to Andrew for banishing him before he dies.

Following Richard's death, Andrew goes on a quest to find other NDR robots that are like him, frequently communicating back to Amanda, who has since married and divorced, and has a son Lloyd and granddaughter Portia. In 2068, during his quest, Andrew discovers Galatea, an NDR robot that has been modified with female personality and traits. Andrew becomes interested in how Galatea was modified by Rupert Burns, the son of the original NDR designer, and finds he has a number of potential ideas to help make robots appear more human-like. Andrew agrees to fund Rupert's work and to be a test subject and is soon given a human-like appearance. Andrew finally returns to the Martin home in 2088 and finds that Amanda has grown old while Portia looks much like her grandmother at her age. Portia is initially cautious of Andrew, but soon accepts him as part of the Martin family.

When Amanda dies, Andrew realises that all those he cares for will also pass on. He presents ideas to Rupert to create artificial organs that not only can be used in humans to prolong their lives but also to replace Andrew's mechanical workings. Andrew gains the ability to eat, feel emotions and sensations, and even have sexual relationships, resulting in him and Portia falling in love. Andrew petitions the World Congress to recognize him as a human as to allow him to marry Portia, but the body expresses concern that an immortal human will cause jealousy from others. Andrew returns to Rupert for one last operation: to change the artificial fluids driving his body into a blood equivalent. Rupert cautions him that the blood will not last forever, causing his body to age and will die eventually, a fate Andrew accepts. Several decades afterwards, Andrew again approaches the World Congress, with Portia as support, to appeal their past decision, wanting to be able to die with dignity.

On April 2, 2205, with Andrew's body deteriorating, he and Portia are both under life support monitored by Galatea, now with a human appearance. They hold hands and watch the World Congress as they recognize Andrew as a human being, the world's oldest at 200 years, and giving all rights confirmed by that, including validating his marriage to Portia. Andrew dies during the broadcast, which is confirmed by Galatea while Portia asserts that Andrew already knew the answer. After ordering Galatea to turn off her life support, Portia soon dies, hand-in-hand with Andrew as she whispers to him "See you soon".

Cast 
 Robin Williams as Andrew Martin, an NDR android servant of the Martin family that seeks to become human. Before Williams was cast, Tim Allen was considered for the role of Andrew Martin, but turned it down due to his commitment on Galaxy Quest.
 Sam Neill as Richard "Sir" Martin, the patriarch of the Martin family.
 Embeth Davidtz as Amanda "Little Miss" Martin (adult) and Portia Charney; Amanda is a friend of Andrew, the mother of Lloyd and grandmother of Portia while Portia is the daughter of Lloyd, the granddaughter of Amanda and significant other of Andrew.
 Hallie Eisenberg as Amanda "Little Miss" Martin (age 7), the younger daughter of the Martin family. 
 Wendy Crewson as Rachel "Ma'am" Martin, the matriarch of the Martin family.
 Oliver Platt as Rupert Burns, the son of the NDR creator that makes androids look more human-like.
 Kiersten Warren as Galatea, the NDR android servant of Rupert and later a servant of the Martin family.
 Stephen Root as Dennis Mansky
 Angela Landis as Grace "Miss" Martin (adult), the spoiled older brat daughter of the Martin family. 
 Lindze Letherman as Grace "Miss" Martin (age 9)
 Bradley Whitford as Lloyd Charney (adult)
 Igor Hiller as Lloyd Charney (age 10)
 John Michael Higgins as Bill Feingold — Martin Family Attorney
 George D. Wallace as the President/Speaker of the World Congress
 Lynne Thigpen as Marjorie Bota, a later President/Speaker of the World Congress
 Jay Johnston as Charles

Production 
Walt Disney Studios was concerned about the cost of the film, estimated to be over $100 million, and even though pre-production was underway and sets were already being built they pulled the plug and halted production. Disney chairman Joe Roth came to an agreement with Sony Pictures Entertainment Chairman John Calley, to co-finance the film and agreed to split distribution responsibilities for the film between Touchstone Pictures in North America and Columbia Pictures internationally.

Williams confirmed in a Las Vegas Sun interview that his character was not played by a body double and that he had actually worn the robot costume.

Various scenes were shot inside San Francisco City Hall, including the ball scene. The city charged Disney from $5000 to $20000 per day, depending on the particular location used for filming. The heat from two 10,000-watt spotlights triggered the fire sprinkler system and which resulted in flooding which caused water damage. Renovations had only recently been completed after a previous flooding incident. Filming was only interrupted for a few hours, but water damage to the ceilings, carpets, and limestone was significant.

Reception 
On Rotten Tomatoes the film has an approval rating of 36% based on 97 reviews, with an average rating of 4.78/10. The website's critical consensus reads: "Bicentennial Man is ruined by a bad script and ends up being dull and mawkish". On Metacritic it has a weighted average score of 42 out of 100, based on reviews from 31 critics, indicating "mixed reviews". Audiences polled by CinemaScore gave the film an average grade of "A−" on an A+ to F scale.

Roger Ebert gave it two out of four stars: "Bicentennial Man begins with promise, proceeds in fits and starts, and finally sinks into a cornball drone of greeting-card sentiment. Robin Williams spends the first half of the film encased in a metallic robot suit, and when he emerges, the script turns robotic instead. What a letdown". William Arnold of the Seattle Post-Intelligencer said: "[The film] becomes a somber, sentimental and rather profound romantic fantasy that is more true to the spirit of the Golden Age of science-fiction writing than possibly any other movie of the '90s".
Todd McCarthy of Variety summed it up as "an ambitious tale handled in a dawdling, sentimental way".

Accolades 
 Academy Awards — Best Makeup (lost to Topsy-Turvy)
 Blockbuster Entertainment Award — Favorite Actor — Comedy (Robin Williams) (lost to Adam Sandler in Big Daddy)
 Blockbuster Entertainment Award — Favorite Actress — Comedy (Embeth Davidtz) (lost to Drew Barrymore in Never Been Kissed)
 Hollywood Makeup Artist and Hair Stylist Guild Award — Best Character Makeup — Feature (lost to Sleepy Hollow)
 Nickelodeon Kids' Choice Awards — Favorite Movie Actor (Robin Williams) (lost to Adam Sandler in Big Daddy)
 Razzie Award — Worst Actor (Robin Williams) (lost to Adam Sandler in Big Daddy)
 Seiun Award — Best Dramatic Presentation (lost to Kōkidō Gensō Gunparade March)
 YoungStar Award — Best Young Actress/Performance in a Motion Picture Comedy (Hallie Kate Eisenberg) (lost to Natalie Portman in Where the Heart Is)

References

External links 

 Bicentennial Man at D23.com
 
 
 
 
 

1492 Pictures films
1999 films
1990s science fiction comedy-drama films
1999 science fiction films
1999 comedy films
1999 drama films
American robot films
American science fiction comedy-drama films
Android (robot) films
Films about artificial intelligence
Columbia Pictures films
1990s English-language films
Films based on science fiction novels
Films directed by Chris Columbus
Films set in 2005
Films set in 2048
Films set in the 21st century
Films set in the 22nd century
Films set in the 23rd century
Films set in the future
Films set in the San Francisco Bay Area
Films set in Washington, D.C.
Films scored by James Horner
Films based on adaptations
Films produced by Chris Columbus
Films produced by Michael Barnathan
Films produced by Gail Katz
Films produced by Laurence Mark
Films based on works by Isaac Asimov
Medical-themed films
Touchstone Pictures films
1990s American films